Chloris (minor planet designation: 410 Chloris) is a very large main-belt asteroid that was discovered by Auguste Charlois on January 7, 1896, in Nice. It is classified as a C-type asteroid and is probably composed of primitive carbonaceous material. The spectrum of the asteroid displays evidence of aqueous alteration. It is the namesake of the Chloris family of asteroids.

Photometrics of this asteroid made in 1979 gave a light curve with a period of 32.50 hours with a brightness variation of 0.28 in magnitude.

References

External links 
 
 

Chloris asteroids
Chloris
Chloris
C-type asteroids (Tholen)
Ch-type asteroids (SMASS)
18960107